Prajasakti, also spelled as Prajashakti, is a Telugu newspaper that is published in Andhra Pradesh, India by the Communist Party of India (Marxist) [CPI (M)]. It started as a daily newspaper in 1981 with Vijayawada as the centre. Currently it is being published with nine centres (or editions) at Hyderabad, Vijayawada, Visakhapatnam, Tirupati, Khammam, Kurnool, Ananthapur, Rajamahendravaram, Srikakulam, Karimnagar and Ongole. It has a wide network of over 100 primary news-gathering centers across the state.

History 
Prajasakti was a borne child of the freedom struggle. It had its inception in 1942 and was published as a daily from 1945. No sooner it was subjected to repression by the British and was banned in 1948. It started again as a weekly journal in 1969 and took the form of a daily in 1981 with Vijayawada as the edition centre. It had grown very fast in the last decade and won the hearts of the toiling masses, workers and the middle class. Prajasakti forged ahead in an atmosphere when all progressive and democratic forces were facing an uphill task of struggling the onslaughts by imperialism. The second edition started in 1997 from Hyderabad, the third edition in 1997 at Visakhapatnam and the fourth edition in 2001 at Tirupati, the fifth edition in July 2003 and the sixth edition at Kurnool in November 2003, the seventh edition at Rajamahendravaram in May 2005, eighth edition in September 2005, the ninth edition at Srikakulam in 2006, and the tenth edition at Ongole in 2012.

Vision and mission 
Prajasakti is committed to the cause of oppressed people. At its very inception it was with the peasants' struggle in 1981. Prajasakti has always spearheaded the propaganda for secular and progressive values in the society. It strives for democratic values, and upholds the ardent struggle for democracy and a just living waged against the one-sided imperialist globalization. It comes out with a scientific analysis on all contemporary, national and international issues.  Prajasakti stands for the projection of all the just values and relentlessly fights anti-peoples policies, corruption, communalism and many issues that make the life of poor and middle class worse.

Publishers and the team 
Prajasakti daily is a part of the Prajasakti Sahithee Samastha with its headquarters at Hyderabad. It has a team with hundreds of journalists and professionals from the advertisement team, circulation department, software department and technical department and the editorial board headed by Mallajosyula Venkata Subrahmanya Sarma as editor and Y.Acthyutarao as chief general manager. Prajasakti daily is published at the Prajasakti daily printing press that caters the print requirement. Prajasakti daily extends its support to the Prajasakti Book House and the Prajasakti Publishing House, which are the centers for progressive literature in Andhra Pradesh.

'Navatelangana' Telugu daily is an important News paper in Telangana State. Its headquarters at Hyderabad, India. The editorial board headed by S. Veeraiah as Editor. The News paper launched by the then Chief Minister of Telangana, Chandra Sekhara Rao, in June 2015.

www.prajasakti.com The website of Prajasakti

Telugu-language newspapers
1981 establishments in Andhra Pradesh
Newspapers established in 1981
Newspapers published in Vijayawada
Communist Party of India (Marxist)